Rechnaya Matuga is an island in the Sea of Okhotsk, about 1,600 yards southwestward of Matugin Point. The highest point of the island is flat-topped, 220 feet (67.1 m) in height.

Administratively this island belongs to the Magadan Oblast of the Russian Federation.

References

Islands of the Sea of Okhotsk
Islands of the Russian Far East
Islands of Magadan Oblast
Uninhabited islands of Russia